A ministry of petroleum or ministry of oil is a kind of government ministry often found in countries that are producers and exporters of petroleum.

Examples include:
 Ministry of Oil, Kuwait
 Ministry of Oil, Iraq
 Ministry of Oil and Gas, Kazakhstan
 Ministry of Oil and Gas, Oman
 Ministry of Oil and Mineral Reserves, Syria
 Ministry of Petroleum, Egypt
 Ministry of Petroleum, Iran
 Ministry of Petroleum, Pakistan
 Ministry of Petroleum and Energy, Norway
 Ministry of Petroleum and Mineral Resources, Saudi Arabia
 Ministry of Petroleum and Minerals, East Timor
 Ministry of Petroleum and Mining, South Sudan
 Ministry of Petroleum and Natural Gas, India

Petroleum
Petroleum
Petroleum